Eugène Gabriels (27 November 1895 – 28 July 1969) was a Belgian rower. He competed in the men's coxed pair event at the 1924 Summer Olympics.

References

External links
 

1895 births
1969 deaths
Belgian male rowers
Olympic rowers of Belgium
Rowers at the 1924 Summer Olympics
Rowers from Ghent